The Papua New Guinean ambassador in Washington, D. C. is the official representative of the Government in Port Moresby to the Government of the United States.

List of representatives

References 

 
United States
Papua New Guinea